Glaser is a surname that is derived from the occupation of the glazier, or glass cutter.

Notable persons with this surname
 Albrecht Glaser (born 1942), German politician
 Barney Glaser (born 1930), American sociologist
 Benny Glaser (born 1989), World Series of Poker multiple event winner
 Christopher Glaser (1615 – c. 1670), Swiss chemist
 Chris Glaser, writer and minister of religion
 Daniel Glaser, Deputy Assistant Secretary in the US Department of Treasury 
 Donald A. Glaser (1926–2013), Nobel prize winner in physics
 Eduard Glaser (1855–1908), Austrian Arabist and archaeologist
 Elizabeth Glaser (1947–1994), American AIDS activist
 Elizabeth Glaser (artist) (fl. 1815–1830), American folk artist
Emmanuel Glaser (born 1964), French Lawyer
 Franjo Glaser (1913–2003), Croatian footballer
 Georg K. Glaser (1910–1995), writer
 Joe Glaser (1896–1969), American talent agent
 Johann Glaser (1629–1675), Swiss anatomist
 Judith E. Glaser, American author and businessperson
 Julius Anton Glaser (1831–1885), Austrian jurist and politician
 Milton Glaser (1929–2020), American graphic designer
 Nikki Glaser (born 1984), American television host of Not Safe with Nikki Glaser
 Paul Michael Glaser (born 1943), actor
 Peter Glaser (1923–2014), American scientist
 Peter Gläser (1949–2008), German musician
 Petr Glaser (born 1988), Czech footballer
 Rob Glaser (born 1962), founder of RealNetworks, Inc.
 Robert Glaser (1921–2012), educational psychologist
 Sam Glaser (born 1962), musician 
  (1922–1987), Polish scientist
 Vladimir Jurko Glaser (1924–1984), Croatian theoretical physicist
 Werner Wolf Glaser (1910–2006), German-born Swedish composer, musician, and poet
 Tompall & the Glaser Brothers, American country music vocal trio
 Chuck Glaser (1936–2019)
 Jim Glaser (1937–2019)
 Tompall Glaser (1933–2013)

See also
 Glazer
 Glasser
 Cor-Bon/Glaser, an ammunition manufacturer
 Glaser Safety Slug

Occupational surnames
German-language surnames
Jewish surnames